The Lutheran antigen systems is a classification of human blood based on the presence of substances called Lutheran antigens on the surfaces of red blood cells. There are 19 known Lutheran antigens.

All of these antigens arise from variations in a gene called BCAM (basal cell adhesion molecule). The system is based on the expression of two codominant alleles, designated Lua and Lub. The antigens Aua and Aub, known as the Auberger antigens, were once thought to make up a separate blood group but were later shown to be Lutheran antigens arising from variations in the BCAM gene.

The phenotypes Lu(a+b−) and Lu(a+b+) are found at various frequencies within populations. The Lu(a−b+) phenotype is the most common in all populations, whereas the Lu(a−b−) phenotype is uncommon. Though present in the fetus, it is seldom the cause of erythroblastosis fetalis or of transfusion reactions.

Notes

Blood antigen systems
Transfusion medicine